Bolivar is a city in and the county seat of Hardeman County, Tennessee, United States. The town was named for South American revolutionary leader Simón Bolívar. As of the 2010 census, the city population was 5,417.

Bolivar is served by William L. Whitehurst Field (airport).

Geography

Sights
The area is home to several historic properties and historic districts among the National Register of Historic Places listings in Hardeman County, Tennessee including Bolivar Court Square Historic District, Western State Hospital Historic District, North Main Street Historic District, and the Bills-McNeal Historic District.

Demographics

2020 census

As of the 2020 United States census, there were 5,205 people, 2,224 households, and 1,183 families residing in the city.

2000 census
As of the census of 2000, there were 5,802 people, 2,161 households, and 1,462 families residing in the city. The population density was 684.4 people per square mile (264.2/km2). There were 2,352 housing units at an average density of 277.4 per square mile (107.1/km2). The racial makeup of the city was 56.39% African American, 42.33% White,  0.50% Asian, 0.07% Native American, 0.02% Pacific Islander, 0.62% from two or more races, and 0.07% from other races. Hispanic or Latino of any race were 0.60% of the population.

There were 2,161 households, out of which 31.4% had children under the age of 18 living with them, 39.0% were married couples living together, 24.9% had a female householder with no husband present, and 32.3% were non-families. 30.0% of all households were made up of individuals, and 14.5% had someone living alone who was 65 years of age or older. The average household size was 2.45 and the average family size was 3.03.

In the city, the population was spread out, with 26.7% under the age of 18, 9.0% from 18 to 24, 25.6% from 25 to 44, 21.5% from 45 to 64, and 17.3% who were 65 years of age or older. The median age was 37 years. For every 100 females, there were 83.0 males. For every 100 females age 18 and over, there were 75.1 males.

The median income for a household in the city was $28,651, and the median income for a family was $35,298. Males had a median income of $30,442 versus $21,544 for females. The per capita income for the city was $14,973. About 19.5% of families and 23.2% of the population were below the poverty line, including 28.7% of those under age 18 and 28.6% of those age 65 or over.

Notable people
Wayne Chism, former basketball player for the University of Tennessee Volunteers, lived in Bolivar and played high school basketball at Bolivar Central High School.
John Dodge, baseball player
Willie Kemp, former basketball player for the University of Memphis, lived in Bolivar and played high school basketball at Bolivar Central High School.
Wayne Farris, known as Pro Wrestler The Honky Tonk Man, lived in Bolivar.

Climate
The climate in this area is characterized by relatively high temperatures and evenly distributed precipitation throughout the year.  According to the Köppen Climate Classification system, Bolivar has a Humid subtropical climate, abbreviated "Cfa" on climate maps.

References

External links

Official site
City charter

Cities in Tennessee
Cities in Hardeman County, Tennessee
County seats in Tennessee
Majority-minority cities and towns in Tennessee